Fijai is a village in the Western region of Ghana. It is 11 kilometres from the centre  Takoradi the Western regional capital. The village serves as a dormitory village for workers who work in and around the Takoradi metropolis.

Boundaries
The village is bordered on Nkroful on the East, Botumagyabu on the West, Effia on the North and Sekondi on the south.

Notable place
The Fijai Secondary School, a co-educational second cycle school is in the village. For over fifty years, the school has produced men and women who are found in different industries in Ghana.

References

Populated places in the Western Region (Ghana)